ABANCA Corporación Bancaria, S.A. is a Spanish bank based in Galicia. It was created in 2011 following the "bankisation" of Novacaixagalicia savings bank. It operates in the autonomous communities of Galicia, Asturias and the province of León, in other parts of Spain and in Portugal, as well as offices in the UK, Germany, France, Switzerland, Brazil, Venezuela, Panama, Mexico and the USA.

History

ABANCA
Formerly NCG Banco, S.A., which traded as Novagalicia Banco, was created in September 2011 following the bankisation process of Novacaixagalicia.

As Novagalicia Banco's predecessor, the savings bank Novacaixagalicia, was subsequently bailed out by the Government of Spain the majority of the shares in the company were held by the bailout program Fund for Orderly Bank Restructuring (90.57%). The Novacaixagalicia Foundation holds 6.84% with the remaining 2.59% being held by private investors.

Evo Banco
On 12 March 2012 NCG Banco, S.A. began operating its assets outside of Galicia under the brand name EVO Banco and launched its main financial product the Cuenta Inteligente. In its first four weeks EVO Banco had attracted 8,290 clients and 70 million euros worth of investment.

On 9 September 2013 Novagalicia Banco announced that it would sell the EVO Banco division to the American private equity firm Apollo Global Management for 60 million euros.

Sale
Subsequently, Novagalicia Banco began opening branches in other cities in Spain under its own brand.

On 11 November 2013, the Spanish government bailout program Fund for Orderly Bank Restructuring (FROB) began the privatization process of Novagalicia Banco. After analyzing six bids presented by various Spanish banks, investments funds and international banks on December 18 the FROB opted to sell its shareholding to Banco Etcheverría, S.A, a Venezuelan-owned Spanish bank, for €1.03 billion

The sale was finalised on 25 June 2014 when Banesco, Banco Etcheverría's parent company, made an initial payment of €403 million. Banesco would pay a further €200 million on 30 June 2017 and the final payment of €300 million a year later.

Rebranding

Merger
In December 2014 the company announced the merger of NCG Banco, S.A. with parent company Banco Echeverria, S.A. The company changed its legal name to ABANCA Corporación Bancaria, S.A. and its headquarters would be in the town of Betanzos, in the former headquarters of Banco Echeverria.

Acquisition

On 27 March 2018 Deutsche Bank announced its private and commercial client business in Portugal would be acquired by Abanca for €6.5bn. The business resumed trading Start of business on 11 June 2019.

Operations

Headquarters
Abanca has two operating headquarters; the institutional and business address in Vigo, and the social and tax address in A Coruña.

Investment portfolio

See also

 Fondo de Reestructuración Ordenada Bancaria
 List of banks in Spain

References

External links

Official
 www.abancacorporacionbancaria.com/
 www.abanca.com
Financial
 NCG Banco, S.A. — Comisión Nacional del Mercado de Valores

Banks of Spain
Companies based in Galicia (Spain)
Banks established in 2011
Banks under direct supervision of the European Central Bank